Asmita may refer to:
 ABP Asmita, an Indian television news channel
 Asmita English Secondary School, a school in Lalitpur, Nepal
 Asmita Gardens, a residential complex in Bucharest
 Asmita Law College, a law school in Vikhroli, Mumbai, India
 Asmita Marwa (active since 1990s), Indian fashion designer
 Asmita Sood (born 1989), Indian model
 Yoga (philosophy) Epistemology referring to Egoism